Miguel Ángel Sainz-Maza López (born 6 January 1993), commonly known as Miguel Ángel, is a Spanish professional footballer who plays as a left winger for Italian  club Audace Cerignola.

Club career
Born in Santoña, Cantabria, Miguel Ángel joined local giants Racing de Santander's youth system in 2003, aged 10. In 2011, after impressing with the Cantabrians Juvenil squad, he moved to FC Barcelona.

On 20 June 2012 Miguel Ángel was promoted to the Catalans' reserve squad, and played his first match as a professional on 13 October, coming on as a late substitute in a 3–0 home success over Sporting de Gijón in the Segunda División.

On 10 January of the following year Miguel Ángel joined Real Betis B on loan until the end of the season. After only starting once with the Andalusians (which eventually suffered relegation), he returned to Barça, and eventually rescinded his link, joining Italian Serie B side Reggina Calcio.

After appearing in only ten matches with the Amaranto during the campaign, Miguel Ángel signed a two-year deal with Lega Pro club Foggia Calcio on 6 August 2014. On 26 July 2017, he joined Pordenone Calcio on loan.

On 31 January 2019, he signed a one-and-a-half-year contract with another Serie C club, Cavese. Just three days later, in his first game for Cavese, he came on as a substitute against his previous club Sicula Leonzio and scored a winning penalty kick in a 3–2 victory.

On 22 August 2020 he went to Gubbio.

On 3 August 2022, he moved to Audace Cerignola.

References

External links
 
 
 

1993 births
Living people
Footballers from Cantabria
Spanish footballers
Association football wingers
Segunda División players
FC Barcelona Atlètic players
Betis Deportivo Balompié footballers
Serie B players
Serie C players
Reggina 1914 players
Calcio Foggia 1920 players
Pordenone Calcio players
Pisa S.C. players
A.S.D. Sicula Leonzio players
Cavese 1919 players
A.S. Gubbio 1910 players
S.S.D. Audace Cerignola players
Spanish expatriate footballers
Spanish expatriate sportspeople in Italy
Expatriate footballers in Italy